Dawson Devoy (born 20 November 2001) is an Irish professional association football player who plays as a midfielder for EFL League One club Milton Keynes Dons and the Republic of Ireland U21 national team.

Club career

Bohemians
Devoy played for Home Farm and St Kevin's Boys at youth level. He joined the U17 side of League of Ireland Premier Division club Bohemians in March 2018, before signing professional terms in 2019. Devoy made his first team debut on 27 May 2019 as a 68th-minute substitute in a 2–0 League of Ireland Cup quarter-final win over Cork City. He made his league debut on 15 July 2019 as a 79th-minute substitute in a 3–0 defeat away to UCD.

Following limited opportunities the previous season, in 2021 Devoy featured regularly in both the league and UEFA Europa Conference League. He scored his first goal for the club on 21 May 2021 in a 2–1 defeat away to St Patrick's Athletic. After an impressive season which included an international call-up to the Republic of Ireland U21s, Devoy was named the PFAI Young Player of the Year and featured in the PFAI Team of the Year for 2021.

After re-signing with Bohemians in December 2021, he continued to perform into the 2022 season, scoring 8 goals and providing 2 assists in 22 league games amid increased interest from other clubs.

Milton Keynes Dons
On 13 July 2022, Devoy joined EFL League One club Milton Keynes Dons on a three-year deal for an undisclosed fee.

International career
Devoy made his international debut for the Republic of Ireland U21 team during the 2023 UEFA European Under-21 qualifiers against Luxembourg.

Career statistics

Honours

Individual
 PFAI Young Player of the Year: 2021
 PFAI Team of the Year: 2021
 League of Ireland Player of the Month: July 2021

References

External links

2001 births
Living people
Bohemian F.C. players
Milton Keynes Dons F.C. players
League of Ireland players
English Football League players
Republic of Ireland association footballers
Republic of Ireland youth international footballers
Republic of Ireland under-21 international footballers
Association football midfielders
Association footballers from County Meath
People from County Meath